Sir  Thomas Hudson Middleton   (1863–1943) was a British biologist.

He was a Professor of Agriculture at the Durham College of Science, when in January 1902 he was elected Professor of Agriculture at the University of Cambridge. Five months later, he received the honorary degree Master of Arts (MA) from the university at a congregation in June 1902. He was later chairman of the Agricultural Research Council.

References

External links
Papers of Sir Thomas Hudson Middleton

1863 births
1943 deaths
British biologists
Fellows of the Royal Society
Drapers Professors of Agriculture
Knights Commander of the Order of the Indian Empire
Knights Commander of the Order of the British Empire
Companions of the Order of the Bath